Beta Tucanae, Latinized from β Tucanae, is a group of six stars which appear to be at least loosely bound into a system in the constellation Tucana. Three of the stars are luminous and distinct enough to have been given their own Bayer designations, β¹ Tucanae through β³ Tucanae. The system is approximately 140 light years from Earth.

β¹,² Tucanae

The two brightest stars, Beta-1 Tucanae and Beta-2 Tucanae, also referred to as Beta Tucanae A and Beta Tucanae C, are 27 arcseconds, or at least 1100 astronomical units (AU) apart. They are both main sequence dwarfs, Beta-1 a blue-white B-type star with an apparent magnitude of +4.36, and Beta-2 a white A-type star with an apparent magnitude of +4.53.

Both of these bright stars have at least one closer main sequence companion. Beta Tucanae B is a magnitude +13.5 M3-type star which is a close companion to Beta-1, being 2.4 arcseconds, or at least 100 AU away. Beta-2's companion, the 6th magnitude Beta Tucanae D, is another A-type star which is separated by approximately 0.38 arcseconds (16 AU) from Beta-2.

β³ Tucanae

Beta-3 Tucanae is a binary star which is separated from Beta-1 and Beta-2 Tucanae by 9 arcminutes on the sky, which puts the two systems at least 23 000 astronomical units (AU) or 0.37 light years apart. It is not clear how tightly Beta-3 Tucanae is gravitationally bound to the rest of the β Tucanae system, but all the stars have similar distances from Earth and have the same proper motion on the sky, indicating they are gravitationally influencing each other to some degree.

Both components of the binary system are white A-type main sequence stars and they have apparent magnitudes of +5.8 and +6.0. They are separated by 0.1 arcseconds, or at least 4 astronomical units.

Beta-3 Tucanae has an infrared excess, suggesting the presence a debris disk around the primary star. The distance of the other star to the debris disk is not known.

β Tucanae system
Beta-1a's binary companion, Beta-1b, orbits at a bit over three times Neptune's distance from the Sun. The Beta-2 pair is located over ten times further away. The pair is separated by less than the distance from the Sun to Uranus. The Beta-3 pair is much further out, at one-and-a-half times the distance of Proxima Centauri from the main Alpha Centauri pair. The Beta-3 pair are separated by less distance than the Sun and Jupiter.

References

B-type main-sequence stars
A-type main-sequence stars
Binary stars
6

Tucana (constellation)
Tucanae, Beta
Durchmusterung objects
002884 2885 3003
002484 487 578
0126 36